Robert Eugene Dernier (born January 5, 1957), also known as "Bobby", is an American former professional baseball center fielder, who played in Major League Baseball (MLB) for the Philadelphia Phillies and Chicago Cubs, in the 1980s. The fleet-afoot 1984 Gold Glove Award winner was also known as "The Deer", to fans at Chicago's Wrigley Field.
Dernier experimented as a switch hitter during part of the 1983 season with Philadelphia.

Biography
After graduating from high school in Kansas City, Missouri, Dernier attended Longview Community College, where he played baseball and majored in journalism. He led the minor leagues three times in stolen bases—77 with Peninsula in 1979, 71 with Reading in 1980, and 71 for Oklahoma City in 1981.

Dernier was traded along with Gary Matthews and Porfi Altamirano from the Phillies to the Cubs for Bill Campbell and Mike Diaz on March 27, 1984. He was the leadoff hitter for the Cubs' 1984 N.L. East division championship team. Hall of Fame second baseman Ryne Sandberg batted second and the lead-off pair was dubbed "The Daily Double" by Cubs announcer Harry Caray. Dernier was a member of the 1983 Phillies team, which won the National League pennant but lost the World Series to the Baltimore Orioles, and the 1984 Cubs team which won the NL East but lost in the playoffs to the San Diego Padres. He homered leading off the first inning of Game 1 in the 1984 National League Championship Series to kick off a 13-0 victory for the Cubs, but they dropped the series, three games to two.

From the mid-1990s through at least 2004, Dernier was an instructor at a baseball training academy in Kansas City. Dernier was named the Cubs major league first base coach on August 23, 2010, after serving as the team's minor league outfield and base-running coordinator since 2007. He remained a Cub coach until the end of the 2012 season.

See also
List of Major League Baseball career stolen bases leaders

References

External links

1957 births
Living people
Major League Baseball center fielders
Major League Baseball first base coaches
Chicago Cubs coaches
Baseball players from Kansas City, Missouri
Chicago Cubs players
Philadelphia Phillies players
Helena Phillies players
Spartanburg Phillies players
Peninsula Pilots players
Reading Phillies players
Oklahoma City 89ers players
Junior college baseball players in the United States